Antoon Coolen (April 17, 1897 - November 9, 1961) was a well-known Dutch writer of novels. He wrote the Boekenweekgeschenk for the Boekenweek of 1947 and a novel that was part of the Boekenweekgeschenk in 1939.

Translations in English 
 Antoon Coolen: The golden webs.  Transl. from the Dutch by Marten ten Hoor. Michigan, 1953
 Antoon Coolen: Christmas rose.  Transl. from the Dutch by Marten ten Hoor. Michigan, 1952
 Antoon Coolen: The cross purposes. Transl. from the Dutch by Jacobine Menzies-Wilson. London, Collins, 1948

1897 births
1961 deaths
Dutch male novelists
People from Gulpen-Wittem
20th-century Dutch novelists
20th-century Dutch male writers